E! (an initialism for Entertainment Television) is an American basic cable channel which primarily focuses on pop culture, celebrity focused reality shows, and movies, owned by the NBCUniversal Television and Streaming division of NBCUniversal, a subsidiary of Comcast.

As of January 2016, E! is available to 92.4 million households in the United States.

History

Movietime
E! was originally launched on July 31, 1987, as Movietime, a service that aired movie trailers, entertainment news, event and awards coverage, and interviews as an early example of a national barker channel. The channel was founded by Larry Namer and Alan Mruvka. Early Movietime hosts included Greg Kinnear, Katie Wagner, Julie Moran, Suzanne Kay (daughter of Diahann Carroll), Mark DeCarlo, Sam Rubin and Richard Blade.

E!

Controlling ownership was originally held by a consortium of five cable television providers (Comcast, Continental Cablevision, Cox Cable, TCI, and Warner Cable), HBO/Warner Communications, and various founding shareholders, with HBO directly programming and managing the network. In 1989, after Time Inc. bought Warner Communications to fend off a takeover bid by Paramount, the new Time Warner company held four of the eight major ownership positions and took over management control of Movietime and renamed the network as E!: Entertainment Television on June 1, 1990; this name change was made to emphasize its widening coverage of the celebrity–industrial complex, contemporary film, television and music, daily Hollywood gossip, and fashion.

In 1997, Comcast, one of the minority partners, teamed up with Disney/ABC Cable Networks to buy the channel after Time Warner had exercised their put agreement. Comcast increased the ownership stakes in the network through mergers with forerunners of TCI and Continental under various circumstances. In November 2006, Comcast acquired Disney's 39.5% share of E! for $1.23 billion to gain full ownership of the network as part of a broader programming carriage agreement between Disney/ABC and Comcast.

In January 2011, Comcast Entertainment Group, the company's television unit, became a division of the NBCUniversal Television Group, after Comcast acquired a 51% majority stake in NBCUniversal from General Electric. E!'s only sister networks prior to the NBC Universal merger were the now-defunct channels Style Network (then Esquire Network) and G4, along with Comcast's sports networks: Versus, Comcast SportsNet and Golf Channel. In the case of Versus, E! staff produced that network's Sports Soup and G4's Web Soup, while the Orlando-based Golf Channel featured no crossovers with E! at all due to incompatible audiences and operations. Versus and Golf Channel were taken under the direct control of the NBC Sports division, with the former being renamed NBC Sports Network in January 2012, and are no longer connected to their former sister networks beyond advertising and in-house operations.

On July 9, 2012, the channel introduced a revised logo (the first change to its logo since the network rebranded as E! in 1990), removing the exclamation mark background behind the "E" but keeping the exclamation point underneath, along with a new slogan "Pop of Culture", which coincided with the launch of the new series Opening Act. The network also started the process of introducing scripted programming (the first series, The Royals, premiering in March 2015), in addition to its existing reality and documentary series. The changes were announced during E!'s programming upfront presentation on April 30, 2012.

On January 13, 2022, E! began to carry NBC Sports coverage of worldwide figure skating trials pre-2022 Winter Olympics for the first time, after the discontinuation of NBCSN spread NBC Sports events across its cable channels. The network had previously carried final week matches for the Premier League on Championship Sunday as part of NBC's rights to the English football league, before the move of matches to Peacock.

Programming

News

E! is one of the few U.S. general-entertainment cable channels that broadcasts a daily news program; its flagship entertainment news program is E! News, which debuted on September 1, 1991. The weekday program (which also has an hour-long weekend edition) features stories and gossip about celebrities, and the film, music and television industries, and has been broadcast under various formats since its launch, even being aired live for a time during the mid-2000s. It was first hosted by Dagny Hultgreen. Steve Kmetko was a host from 1994 to 2002. It has been hosted by Terrence Jenkins and Giuliana Rancic since 2012 and 2006, respectively, with Ryan Seacrest (who co-anchored the program from 2006 to 2012) serving as managing editor of the news operation.

E! News was the only entertainment news show on the channel for much of its history until 2006, when the channel launched The Daily 10, hosted by Sal Masekela and Catt Sadler (Debbie Matenopoulos also co-hosted from the show's inception until 2008); the series was cancelled in September 2010 after E! announced that the weekday editions of E! News would be expanded to one hour starting on October 25, 2010.

E! also carried a simulcast of business news channel Bloomberg Television from 2004 to January 2009, when the latter network had expanded its cable and satellite carriage to a level that allowed the discontinuation of the simulcast.

Outside E! News telecasts, the channel runs an E! News–branded news ticker displaying entertainment news headlines each half-hour during regular programming; fast-breaking entertainment headlines (such as a celebrity arrest or death) may also be displayed on a ticker, during any program when warranted.

On August 5, 2020, E! canceled both New York-based shows, along with In The Room, one of the first of many program and employee cuts and staff realignments announced across NBCUniversal that week due to the pandemic. The news operation has continued to maintain the E! News website, and its social media presences.

Original series
The network was known early on for its daily video simulcast of the Howard Stern Show, which aired from June 20, 1994, until July 8, 2005, weeknights in a redacted half-hour form, airing three times in late night. The program was discontinued several months after Stern moved to Sirius Satellite Radio and sold the video rights to his show to pay-per-view provider In Demand as a monthly pay offering (video rights are now held by Sirius XM).

E! is known for its live red carpet pre-shows for the industry's three prominent award shows, the Primetime Emmy Awards, the Golden Globe Awards, and the Academy Awards, and were famous for their fashion critiques by Joan Rivers; Rivers also hosted post-awards specials under the title Fashion Police, which became a regular weekly series in September 2010. In April 2017, it was announced that E! had acquired the People's Choice Awards, which will move to the network from CBS in 2018 with a new November scheduling. The network promoted that the show would be given an "end-to-end" experience that will leverage its existing experience in awards show coverage. As ratings declined across all of cable television overall, the People's Choice returned to broadcast television in 2021, with E! simulcasting the ceremony with NBC.

The network also produces many documentary and biographical series, most notably E! True Hollywood Story; many of E!'s original specials are entertainment-related ranging from light fare (such as 25 Cutest Child Stars All Grown Up) to serious fare (such as 15 Most Unforgettable Hollywood Tragedies). It also produces specials centering on investigative and crime stories including E! Investigates, which features topical investigative reports on subjects ranging from child prostitution to teenage pregnancy.

In recent years, the network has become known for its reality television programs. Its most popular series for over a decade has been Keeping Up with the Kardashians, which spawned eight spin-off series and countless specials. Other original reality programming airing on the network currently includes Total Divas–a series featuring the WWE's Bella Twins, Hollywood Medium with Tyler Henry, the plastic surgery repair series Dr. 90210 and Botched, along with Very Cavallari with Kristin Cavallari and her (later ex-) husband Jay Cutler,  Ladygang–a television version of the popular podcast, and dating show Dating #NoFilter,

E! has had five comedy programs: the late night talk show Chelsea Lately, hosted by comedian Chelsea Handler, its scripted/improvised spin-off After Lately, and The Soup (based on the popular 1991-2002 E! series Talk Soup), featuring clips of the previous week's TV shows with humorous commentary delivered by the host, actor/comedian Joel McHale. Handler also produced Love You, Mean It, a weekly comedic look at pop culture hosted by Whitney Cummings, and a nightly talk show from actress Busy Philipps, Busy Tonight. The Soup returned in February 2020, with new host Jade Catta-Preta, though it, and many of E!'s in-studio shows, were cancelled in the last quarter of 2020 due to the effects of the COVID-19 pandemic hampering production.

On September 8, 2020, it was announced the network's most popular series Keeping Up with the Kardashians would be ending with season 20 in 2021.

Acquired series and films
Over the years, E! has occasionally run acquired programming including reruns of Alice, Absolutely Fabulous, 20/20 lifestyle-based interview shows from ABC (since removed under NBCUniversal ownership), and edited 60-minute versions of Saturday Night Live, though fewer of these programs currently air. The only programming currently airing on E! that it does not produce are broadcast standards-edited reruns of the former HBO series Sex and the City originally carried by HBO's sister network TBS, and feature films that air under the banner "Movies We Love"; the latter was part of a since-abandoned initiative by the network to use films to increase the network's ratings, though the branding remains, and low and mid-grossing female-focused films from the Universal Pictures library usually receive their basic cable premiere on E!, with higher-grossing films premiering on USA Network. The network has aired same-week runs of NBC series (such as The Voice, Fashion Star, Whitney, and Are You There, Chelsea?), and in the past aired previews of G4 programming to give that network an extended promotional platform due to their lowered carriage when it was removed from DirecTV in November 2010. The network also airs selected shows from the Peacock streaming service (which E!'s parent company NBCUniversal owns).

Sports 
Since Comcast's acquisition of NBCUniversal, E! has infrequently aired sporting events as an overflow outlet for NBC Sports. It has participated in NBC's "Championship Sunday" effort to broadcast all matches on the final matchday of the Premier League soccer season. In January 2022 (amid the shutdown of long-time sister channel NBCSN), E! was incorporated into NBC Sports' coverage of two figure skating events ahead of the 2022 Winter Olympics, the 2022 European Figure Skating Championships and Four Continents Figure Skating Championships.

E! HD
E! HD is a high definition simulcast feed of E! launched on December 8, 2008, in Comcast's default 1080i resolution format. Currently, the network's entire original programming roster post-2010 is carried in high definition, along with most films. Available on the vast majority of pay television providers, it is downscaled at the provider headend level to provide a standard definition equivalent for those systems.

During E!'s run as a broadcast service in Canada, the E! Ontario version of the service until the December 2008 discontinuation of the E! broadcast television system was available in HD over Hamilton, Ontario-based CHCH-TV (channel 11) on its channel 18 ATSC digital signal, though the majority of E!'s programming outside American primetime series before the shutdown of the television system was not available in the format.

E! Online
E! Online is the online arm of E!, featuring live updates on entertainment news stories; the website includes an online-only entertainment news bulletin titled E! News Now, which is updated each weekday. The website also provides live streaming video of major red carpet events including movie premieres and award shows such as the Academy Awards and the Emmys, along with some blogs involving shows such as The Soup. Columnists featured on the website include Kristin dos Santos (the "Watch with Kristin" television blog), Ted Casablanca ("The Awful Truth" gossip blog), and Marc Malkin (writer of an eponymous gossip blog and host of a daily video blog on the site).

As part of the rebrand of the cable channel on July 9, 2012, EOnline.com was redesigned for HTML5, including tablet and mobile devices.

International versions

Australia and New Zealand

Canada
Unlike most international cable channels that have licensed an American cable channel's branding and programming, E! has existed as two separate television channels in Canada – in both broadcast and pay television forms.

On September 7, 2007, Canwest Global Communications rebranded its CH television system as E!. CH originally launched on February 12, 2001, by CHCH/Hamilton, Ontario as a secondary service of the Global Television Network; the CH/E! system would later include four additional Canwest-owned stations in Quebec (CJNT/Montreal), British Columbia (CHEK/Victoria and CHBC/Kelowna) and Alberta (CHCA/Red Deer), and three affiliates owned by Jim Pattison Group in British Columbia (CKPG/Prince George and CFJC/Kamloops) and Alberta (CHAT/Medicine Hat). The E! television system shut down on September 1, 2009, due to low ratings and corporate financial difficulties that eventually led to Canwest filing for bankruptcy protection and selling its properties to Shaw Media for US$6.7 million; the E! owned-and-operated stations experienced varied fates (CHCH and CJNT were sold to Channel Zero, CHEK was sold to an employee-led group; CHBC remained with Canwest and was converted into a Global O&O, and CHCA ceased operations outright), while the Pattison Group stations affiliated with the Rogers Media-owned Citytv system. As E!, local news and other regional programming, as well as most local community sponsorships on the O&O stations, used local branding (incorporating the callsign branding scheme common with Canadian stations not owned by a network or television system). This decision was at least partly made to avoid confusion with E! News, but likely intended to ensure that local newscasts were not perceived as celebrity-oriented.

The E! brand would later return to Canada on November 1, 2010, when CTVglobemedia (whose assets are now owned by Bell Media) signed a multi-year/multi-platform agreement with Comcast to rebrand Category 2 specialty channel Star! (which had a similar format to E! U.S. and had carried some of its programming prior to the 2007 rebranding of CH) into a Canadian version of E! on November 29, 2010.

Europe

Asia

E!'s Asian network aired across Southeast Asia and the Philippines from December 15, 1997, until December 31, 2019.

Philippines
Some of E! programs started to air on Cinema Television during its inception by RMN (thru UHF Channel 31; now acquired by BEAM). But in 2000, both RMN and E! announced its partnership to relaunch CTV into E! Philippines. It was originally broadcast 24 hours a day, but eventually reduced in 2001 to a primetime 6-midnight block, before ending in 2003. Some of E!'s programs were brought to the Philippines and remade in a local version, one of which was Wild On! Philippines.

Three years after the relaunch as a standalone cable channel, E! produced its first original reality series in Asia, It Takes Gutz to Be A Gutierrez starring the Gutierrez family.

Israel
E! is broadcast in Israel by cable provider HOT and by satellite provider yes.

South Korea

References

External links

E! - Latin America official website 
Wikinews interview with Michael Musto about the art of celebrity journalism

 
1987 establishments in California
Television networks in the United States
Companies based in Los Angeles
English-language television stations in the United States
Infotainment
NBCUniversal networks
Former Time Warner subsidiaries
Television channels and stations established in 1987